Vivien S. Crea (born 1952) was the 25th Vice Commandant of the United States Coast Guard under Admiral Thad W. Allen. Vice Commandant is the second highest position in the Coast Guard, and she was the first woman to hold it. She is the former Commander of the Coast Guard Atlantic Area, and was confirmed by the Senate to her historic post in June 2006. Crea retired on August 7, 2009, and was replaced by VADM David Pekoske.

She previously became the first female in the U.S. Armed Forces to serve as a military aide to a President in 1984. Crea later became the first woman to command an air station when she took over Air Station Detroit in 1992. In 2000 she became the first woman to attain flag rank in the United States Coast Guard. In 2006 Crea became the first female Vice Commandant of the United States Coast Guard and the Coast Guard’s first female vice admiral. She later became the first woman to be recognized as the USCG Ancient Albatross in 2008. In 2010, she became the first Coast Guard aviator to be inducted into the Women in Aviation International Pioneer Hall of Fame.

Background and education
Crea earned a master's degree from the Massachusetts Institute of Technology, as well as one from Central Michigan University, and a bachelor's degree from the University of Texas at Austin.

Career
As Lieutenant Commander, she became the first woman from any service, as well as the first service member from the US Coast Guard to serve as the Presidential Military Aide, where she carried the nuclear football for President Ronald Reagan for three years.

Crea assumed command of Coast Guard Atlantic Area on July 16, 2004. This post is the operational commander for all Coast Guard activities in an area of responsibility spanning five Coast Guard Districts, over  covering the Eastern and Midwestern United States from the Rocky Mountains to Maine and Mexico, out across the Atlantic and through the Caribbean Sea, involving over 33,000 military and civilian employees, and 30,000 auxiliarists. She served concurrently as Commander, Coast Guard Defense Force East.

Crea previously served as Commander, First Coast Guard District, overseeing all Coast Guard operations in the Northeastern United States, from the Maine-Canada border to Northern New Jersey. Prior to that she served as Director of Information and Technology of the Coast Guard as chief information officer and oversaw the Coast Guard’s Research and Development program.

Earlier assignments include Chief, Office of Programs in Coast Guard Headquarters, Commanding Officer of Air Station Clearwater, Executive Assistant to the Commandant of the Coast Guard; Commanding Officer, Air Station Detroit; Operations Officer, Air Station Borinquen, Puerto Rico; Coast Guard Aide to President Reagan; and many other operational assignments. As a Coast Guard aviator, Vice Admiral Crea has flown the C-130 Hercules turboprop, HH-65 Dolphin helicopter, and Gulfstream II jet.

Crea was commissioned an Ensign in the Coast Guard Reserve upon graduation from Officer Candidate School (OCS) at Reserve Training Center, Yorktown, Virginia in December, 1973.

Military awards

 
During Crea's tenure as Vice Commandant, she held the title of Ancient Albatross, the longest serving aviator in the Coast Guard.

See also

 List of female United States military generals and flag officers

Notes

External links

Official website of the Vice Commandant

Further reading
 

1952 births
Living people
Female admirals of the United States Coast Guard
Vice Commandants of the United States Coast Guard
University of Texas at Austin alumni
Central Michigan University alumni
Massachusetts Institute of Technology alumni
United States Coast Guard Aviation
United States Naval Aviators
Recipients of the Homeland Security Distinguished Service Medal
Recipients of the Coast Guard Distinguished Service Medal
Recipients of the Legion of Merit
Recipients of the Defense Superior Service Medal
Recipients of the Meritorious Service Medal (United States)
Military aides to the President of the United States
Chief information officers
Women United States Naval Aviators
Recipients of the Humanitarian Service Medal
21st-century American women